Turnaround is a 1978 folk music album by Stan Rogers.

Track listing
All songs written by Stan Rogers unless otherwise indicated.

  "Dark Eyed Molly" (Archie Fisher)
  "Oh No, Not I" (traditional, arr. Stan Rogers)
  "Second Effort"
  "Bluenose"
  "The Jeannie C."
  "So Blue"
  "Front Runner"
  "Song of the Candle"
  "Try Like the Devil"
  "Turnaround"

References

1978 albums
Stan Rogers albums